Elements – The Best of Mike Oldfield is a compilation album by Mike Oldfield, released in 1993 by Virgin Records.

The compilation was first released as a single CD album, which is the most commonly available form today. It was later released with the original Tubular Bells, as a double CD album. Other related releases include a 4-CD box set and a video album.

This compilation was released by Virgin after Oldfield had left the label, but includes "Sentinel" from Tubular Bells II courtesy of the Warner label.

Two of Oldfield's previous hits, "In Dulci Jubilo" and "Moonlight Shadow", were reissued alongside the album.

Track listing 
All tracks by Mike Oldfield except where noted.

 "Tubular Bells (Opening theme)" – 4:19
 "Family Man" (feat. Maggie Reilly) (Tim Cross, Rick Fenn, Mike Frye, Mike Oldfield, Morris Pert, Maggie Reilly) – 3:45
 "Moonlight Shadow" (feat. Maggie Reilly) – 3:36
 "Heaven's Open" – 4:27
 "Five Miles Out" – 4:15
 "To France" (feat. Maggie Reilly) – 4:43
 "Foreign Affair" (feat. Maggie Reilly) (Oldfield, Reilly) – 3:54
 "In Dulci Jubilo" (Pearsall) – 2:50
 "Shadow on the Wall" (feat. Roger Chapman) – 5:07 (12" version)
 "Islands" (feat. Bonnie Tyler) – 4:17
 "Etude" (Francisco Tárrega) – 3:07
 "Sentinel" – 3:56 (Single version)
 "Ommadawn (Excerpt)" – 3:38
 "Incantations part four (Excerpt)" – 4:39
 "Amarok (Excerpt)" – 4:43
 "Portsmouth" – 2:00

Musical scores

Other Elements albums 
 Elements – The Best of Mike Oldfield (video), video/DVD edition
 Elements Box, by Mike Oldfield, four CD edition

Charts

Weekly charts

Year-end charts

Certifications

References

External links 
 Mike Oldfield discography at Amadian.net
 Mike Oldfield discography - Elements at Tubular.net

1993 greatest hits albums
Mike Oldfield compilation albums
Virgin Records compilation albums